Andrea Zerini (born 25 October 1988) is an Italian professional basketball player for Napoli Basket of the Italian Lega Basket Serie A (LBA). Standing at 2.05 m (6 ft. 9 in.), he plays at the forward-center positions.

Professional career

Clubs
Andrea Zerini grew up with Firenze Basket in Florence of the Serie B Basket league. For the 2005–06 season he entered in the senior-team roster. He went to Castelfiorentino for the next three seasons.

At 21 years old he signed a contract with Ruvo di Puglia Basket where he got 9 points per match, with 55% from 2 and 31% from 3 shots. During the 2010–11 season he was the best blocker and the 8th best rebounder of the league.

For the 2011–2012 season he signed a contract with New Basket Brindisi. He achieved the promotion to the top-tier. So he was confirmed also for the next season. The 2011-12 LBA season was Zerini's first time in the top-tier of the Italian basketball league system.

On 20 June 2016 Andrea Zerini signed a contract with the LBA club Sidigas Avellino. He was confirmed also for the next season.

On 25 June 2018 Zerini went to Germani Basket Brescia.

On 28 July 2020 Zerini signed with Napoli Basket in the Italian second league Serie A2.

References

External links
Andrea Zerini at legabasket.it 
Andrea Zerini at fibaeurope.com
Andrea Zerini at legaduebasket.it

1988 births
Living people
Basket Brescia Leonessa players
Centers (basketball)
Italian men's basketball players
Lega Basket Serie A players
Napoli Basket players
New Basket Brindisi players
Power forwards (basketball)
Sportspeople from Florence
S.S. Felice Scandone players